Pauleta scored 47 goals in 88 appearances for the Portugal national football team between 1997 and 2006.

On 12 October 2005, he scored twice in a 3–0 win over Latvia at the Estádio do Dragão in Porto in the 2006 FIFA World Cup qualification phase. This took him to 42 goals for Portugal in 77 games, making him the nation's all-time top scorer, surpassing Eusébio, who netted 41 in 64 games between 1961 and 1973. However, he was overtaken by Cristiano Ronaldo in 2014.

Pauleta scored three international hat-tricks against Poland at the 2002 FIFA World Cup, a four-goal haul against Kuwait in 2003 and three goals against Cape Verde in 2006.

Goals

|}

See also
List of FIFA World Cup hat-tricks

References

Pauleta
List
Goal